The Egypt Youth Party is a small democratic secular political party in Egypt.

External links
 at sis.gov.eg

Political parties in Egypt
Political parties established in 2005
Secularism in Egypt
2005 establishments in Egypt
Egyptian nationalists
Egyptian nationalism